Al-Azhar University Faculty of Medicine for Girls is a faculty of Al-Azhar University.

Location

The Faculty of Medicine, Al-Azhar University, Nasr city, Greater Cairo, Egypt
Coordinates: 30°3'15"N   31°19'19"E

The Hospital : Al Zahraa University Hospital in Abbasiyah, Greater Cairo
Coordinates: 30°3'51"N   31°16'54"E

Mission
The mission of Faculty of Medicine Al-Azhar University for Girls is to inculcate and acquire the quality standards in preparing the female graduates with medical knowledge, skills, technicalities and professional behavior in medicine based upon legislation sciences and Islamic culture; and also to apply the basics of scientific thinking and research, and to encourage continuous learning for preparing graduates to provide health care and to progress in the fields that serve the community and environment.

History
The Faculty of Medicine (for girls) was established as one of the applied science faculties of Al-Azhar University following law no. 103 issued in May 1961, Which is concerned with the reorganization of Al-Azhar and its institutions.

The foundation stone of the establishment of the faculty of Medicine (for Girls) was laid down in 1964 when the university council issued a decree for setting up a section for studying Medicine and Surgery . It was affiliated to the Islamic Faculty for Girls. It was responsible for teaching medical science according to the Egyptian system of medical education. This Responsibility includes teaching medical science, carrying out scientific researches in the fields of diagnostic, curative and preventive medicine, together with its peculiarity in teaching Islamic related science and keeping the distinguished the Islamic values.

Studying the curriculum started in 1965 with the preliminary year. This was followed by the establishment of academic departments and finally the clinical ones, where in 1969 the academic studying commented in the laboratories of the faculty, while the clinical studying started in the hospital of Manshiet El-Bakry after an agreement with the ministry of health.

Postgraduate studies started in all the departments of the faculty in 1971 .

In 1979, the Republican decree no. 116 for the year 1979 has been issued for transforming the section to an independent faculty which showed continuous expansion and progress in all its departments throughout the following years up till now .

In 1983, the Faculty of Medicine was able to attain an educational hospital; namely, “Al-Zahraa University Hospital”.

At the time being, the faculty of Medicine (for Girls) contains 31 departments and two specialized units. The Faculty awards a bachelor's degree of Science in Medicine and Surgery, 29 diplomas, 34 master's degrees and 32 doctorate degrees in the different specialties of medicine.

It is unique as an only faculty of medicine all over Egypt that awards a master's degree in Virology. It is also the only faculty of Al-Azhar faculties for Medicine that provides postgraduate studies in the specialities of Endocrinology and Audiology. Consequently, a number of masters in different sub-specialization is going to be awarded in the near future.

Deans

 Prof. Dr. Nagwa Hassan Abdelaal from 2007 until 2011.
 Prof. Dr. Maha Akl from 2010 until
 prof. Dr jazmen Ali Mohammed 2010 until 2011
 Prof. Dr. Sumaya El Shazly from 2017 until 2018.
 Prof. Dr. Nira Hassan Abdul Rahim Miftah from 2018 until 2020.
 Prof. Dr. Hanaa El-Ebeisy from 2022 until now.

Departments

Academic
Anatomy.
Physiology.
Histology.
Biochemistry.
Pharmacology.
Pathology.
Microbiology.
Parasitology.
Community Medicine and Industrial Medicine.
Forensic Medicine and Toxicology.

Clinical
ENT.
Ophthalmology.
General Medicine.
Cardiology.
Chest.
Clinical Pathology.
Dermatology.
Endocrinology.
Neurology.
Psychiatry.
Tropical Medicine.
Rheumatology and Medical Rehabilitation.
Pediatrics.
Gynecology and Obstetrics.
General Surgery.
Neurosurgery.
Urology.
Orthopedics.
Anesthesia.
Diagnostic Radiology.

Special Units
Immunology.
Virology.

Hospital
Al-Zahra Hospital was established in 1970 and it was called the Institute for burns and in 1975 turned to Al-Zahra Hospital which belongs to the Faculty of Medicine for girls till now.
The hospital contains:
- 23 internal clinical Section, including 6 sections.
- 24 operations room.
- 29 outpatient clinics
- 9 laboratories
- 3 X units (Ct, ultrasound, normal)
- 730 beds and 60 beds belongs psychological Section
- 2 ambulances and vehicle to transport the dead

The hospital's existing employment:
- 265 specialists.
- 249 employees.
- 136 technicians.
- 166 doctors deputies.
- 686 nursing.
- 239 temporary employments.
- 240 fixed workers.

Al Zahraa University Hospital achieved a number of developments and expansions at the level of all sections of the hospital like:
 The opening of the fragmentation of stones department which is an independent unit of Department of Urology,
And it is overseen by the biggest bunch of professors, recently was the opening of the newly renovation in the hospital, where the latest equipment to crush the stones at the highest level.
 The development and expansion of the reception and the emergency and increase the number of the latest equipment, in order to accommodate the greatest possible number of patients.
 The opening of The Liver and pancreas surgery Unit, and liver transplant operations were conducted and other operations like:
 The eradication of liver tumors.
 Injection of tumors in the liver.
 Thermal destruction of liver tumors.
 Channels bile and bitterness.
The building of mental illness department was established from 8 special levels, which contains 60 beds and a section for the care and rehabilitation of women, children and adolescents.
 Ongoing development of the children department by establishment of full level, which is higher than it is now, and also ongoing development of the cardio-thoracic surgery department to increase its capacity, and also ongoing development of the heart and blood vessels department.
 During development, these sections still do their work fully.

References

External links
AFMG Official site

Al-Azhar University